2001 WNBA draft

On April 20, 2001 the regular WNBA draft took place.

Key

Draft selections

Round 1

Round 2

Round 3

Round 4

Notes:

References

Women's National Basketball Association Draft
Draft